Tazovsky (masculine), Tazovskaya (feminine), or Tazovskoye (neuter) may refer to:
Tazovsky District, a district of Yamalo-Nenets Autonomous Okrug, Russia
Tazovsky (rural locality), a rural locality (a settlement) in Yamalo-Nenets Autonomous Okrug, Russia
Tazovsky Airport (ICAO airport code: USDT) there
Taz Estuary (Tazovskaya guba), a gulf formed by the Taz River in Yamalo-Nenets Autonomous Okrug, Russia